is a Japanese businessman who has served as president of the Fédération Internationale de Gymnastique since January 2017. Prior to his election in October 2016, he served as general-secretary of the Japan Gymnastics Association (2009–16) and was on multiple committees with the  Japanese Olympic Committee.

Watanabe is the ninth president of the FIG and its first Asian president. In October 2018, the International Olympic Committee elected him as a new member. He was also appointed an executive board member of Tokyo 2020.

References

External links
FIG: About the President

1959 births
Living people
Presidents of the Fédération Internationale de Gymnastique
People from Kitakyushu
Tokai University alumni
International Olympic Committee members